Golubinsky is a rural locality (a settlement) in Alexeyevsky District, Belgorod Oblast, Russia. The population was 16 as of 2010. There is 1 street.

Geography 
Golubinsky is located 45 km south of Alexeyevka (the district's administrative centre) by road. Krasnoye is the nearest rural locality.

References 

Rural localities in Alexeyevsky District, Belgorod Oblast